The Great Britain–China Centre (GBCC) is an executive non-departmental public body of the Foreign & Commonwealth Office. It was set up by the British government in 1974 to foster understanding and cooperation between the United Kingdom and the People's Republic of China. The GBCC is located in Belgrave Square in central London.

References

External links 
 GBCC website

Non-departmental public bodies of the United Kingdom government
Foreign relations of the United Kingdom
Government agencies established in 1974